Cerekwica may refer to the following places in Poland:
Cerekwica, Lower Silesian Voivodeship (south-west Poland)
Cerekwica, Kuyavian-Pomeranian Voivodeship (north-central Poland)
Cerekwica, Jarocin County in Greater Poland Voivodeship (west-central Poland)
Cerekwica, Poznań County in Greater Poland Voivodeship (west-central Poland)